was a Buddhist temple established in the Asuka period in Sakurai, Nara Prefecture, Japan. The area has been designated a Special Historic Site and forms part of a grouping of sites submitted in 2007 for future inscription on the UNESCO World Heritage List: Asuka-Fujiwara: Archaeological sites of Japan’s Ancient Capitals and Related Properties. Excavations in the 1980s uncovered a well-preserved section of the temple's covered corridors that predate the surviving buildings of Hōryū-ji: "for the history of Japanese architecture, this discovery is of as great moment as the finding of the seventh-century Takamatsuzuka tomb paintings in March 1972 was for the history of Japanese art."

History
Yamada-dera was established in 641 by Soga no Kurayamada no Ishikawa no Maro. After drainage of the site, work began on the kondō and surrounding corridors. The Nihon Shoki chronicles the suicide of the Soga founder at the kondō in 649, after false charges of treason had been brought against him. The Jōgū Shōtoku Hōō Teisetsu, a biography of Shōtoku Taishi, documents renewed construction at the site from 663 with the erection of a pagoda, after Prince Naka-no-Ōe, who had married one of the founder's daughters, had ascended the throne as Emperor Tenchi; this building was complete by 676. The uragaki or notes to Jōgū Shōtoku Hōō Teisetsu mention the eye-opening ceremony of a sixteen-foot Buddha in the temple's Lecture Hall in 685. The Nihon Shoki records a visit by Emperor Temmu a few months later to the temple of Jōdo-ji, identified by Aston as Asuka-dera but now thought to refer to Yamada-dera. In the following decade, Emperor Mommu granted lands to support the temple.

Architecture
Excavations of the site by the Nara Research Institute for Cultural Properties from 1976 have revealed the plan of the complex. The main temple buildings were arranged along a central north-south axis, with the gate opening through the covered corridors and leading to the pagoda, standing in front of the kondō; thus far the plan was the same as at Shitennō-ji, but unlike that temple, the kōdō or lecture hall was outside this inner precinct, behind the rear arcade.

The pillars of the 3x3 bay gate were sunk directly into the ground, rather than their being supported on base stones; similar sunken pillars may be found at Ise Jingū. The central pillar of the 3x3 bay pagoda rested on a base stone a metre below the podium on which it stood, as in the later examples at Hōryū-ji and Hōrin-ji. The base stones, uniquely carved with lotus petals, of the kondō reveal a 3x2 bay central core or moya and unusually narrow side bays. The base stones of the 8x4 bay lecture hall include holes bored for swing doors. The precinct itself extended 22 bays east to west, some eighty-four metres between the outer walls.

In the 1982 phase, at a depth of 2.2 m, a large number of tiles were discovered from the site of the east corridor, including circular eave-end tiles of the "Yamada-dera type", deeply moulded, with eight double lotus petals and a ring of six seeds around the centre. Beneath, a 1.7 bay section of the wooden outer wall was uncovered, including base stones with lotus designs; columns, with marked entasis; base and head penetrating tie-beams; middle non-penetrating tie-beams; latticed windows; sections of lath for plastering; and bracket blocks. Additional elements discovered the following year include bracket arms, rainbow beams, rafters and purlins. Traces of red paint on the timbers and fragments of plaster were also uncovered. Further discoveries in 1984 included better-preserved windows and ground plates and pivot blocks for doors.

The pillars are of camphor other than one of cypress, perhaps an historic repair; the other elements are largely of cypress, although one zelkova tie-beam again seems to be evidence of an historic repair; some of the wall laths are of pine.

Statuary

A bronze Buddha head, tentatively identified as that of Yakushi, is the sole surviving element of the principal triad of the former kōdō or lecture hall. The statue group was cast between 678 and 685. Appropriated by monks from Kōfuku-ji in the 1180s, it was moved to Nara and re-enshrined in Kōfuku-ji's East Kondō. Only the head survived destruction in the fire caused by a lightning strike in 1411. Subsequently deposited under the altar platform, it was rediscovered in 1937 and is now a National Treasure on view in the Kōfukuji National Treasure Museum. The work marks a watershed in the periodization of Japanese Buddhist sculpture. It is a "document of stylistic transition, embodying the naiveté of Suiko faith, yet already swelling with the maturity of Tempyō".

Conservation
To avoid anistropic shrinkage and cell collapse during the drying of the waterlogged wood recovered, the architectural members were treated with polyethylene glycol (PEG), a Synthetic fiber polymer used gradually to replace the water content before permanent hardening. This treatment methodology was introduced in the late 60s and early 70s in Denmark to conserve the Skuldelev ships and in Sweden for the Vasa. In Japan it was used first on wooden tablets from Gangō-ji and then in 1972 on parts from the Kodera dam site in Matsuyama. Although this treatment is irreversible and leads to visual darkening, consolidation with PEG also makes the wood inedible thus helping prevent biodeterioration; since Japanese Buddhist architecture makes use of joinery rather than metal pins, the incompatibility of PEG with associated metal components was not a concern; PEG is the most common choice of consolidant for such applications, and has since been used on the Bremen cog and Mary Rose. Since PEG has an affinity with water, it is necessary to maintain artefacts treated in this way in a stable low-humidity environment. Designated an Important Cultural Property, the excavated artefacts are now stored and displayed at the Asuka Historical Museum.

See also
 Asuka-Fujiwara
 List of National Treasures of Japan (sculptures)
 List of Special Places of Scenic Beauty, Special Historic Sites and Special Natural Monuments
 List of Important Cultural Properties of Japan (Asuka period: structures)
 Conservation Techniques for Cultural Properties
 Japanese Buddhist architecture

References

External links
 Yamada-dera(Asuka Historical Museum)
 Yamada-dera(Asukanet) 
 BCIN Conservation Bibliographic Database (search term: waterlogged wood)
  CiNii article finder (search term: 山田寺)

Buddhist temples in Nara Prefecture
Buddhist archaeological sites in Japan
Special Historic Sites
Buddhism in the Asuka period
Former Buddhist temples
Religious buildings and structures completed in 641
7th-century Buddhist temples